The James H. and Cynthia Koontz House, also known as Koontz House, is an Italianate house in Echo, Oregon that was built in 1881.  It was listed on the National Register of Historic Places in 1997.

It was a home of the Koontz family, a founding family of Echo.

References

Houses on the National Register of Historic Places in Oregon
Italianate architecture in Oregon
Houses completed in 1881
Houses in Umatilla County, Oregon
National Register of Historic Places in Umatilla County, Oregon
1881 establishments in Oregon
Echo, Oregon